Jan Andries Blokker Sr. (27 May 1927 – 6 July 2010) was a Dutch journalist, columnist, publicist, writer, and amateur historian. In The Netherlands, Blokker was best known for his columns in De Volkskrant, which he wrote between 1968 and 2006.

Biography
Blokker, born in the Admiralenbuurt in Amsterdam, grew up in a social liberal family. His father was office clerk. At the age of seven, he and his father weekly visited the Cineac theatre for the Polygoon newsreel.

Blokker went to the HBS on the Keizersgracht. In 1944, after getting his gymnasium-alpha diploma, he went on to study Neerlandistiek and history. He never completed them.

In 1950, Blokker made his debut as a novelist with the novelle Séjour, for which he won the Reina Prinsen Geerligs Award. Two more novels followed, Bij dag en ontij (1952) and Parijs, dode stad (1954). In 1952, Blokker became student reporter for the Dutch newspaper Het Parool. After a while, Simon Carmiggelt asked him to write film reviews. In 1954 he became film critic at Algemeen Handelsblad. At the art section of the news paper, he met important Dutch writers like Henk Hofland and Harry Mulisch.

Blokker was also a screenwriter, who wrote the scripts for films like Fanfare by Bert Haanstra (1958) and Makkers Staakt uw Wild Geraas by Fons Rademakers (1960) and Monsieur Hawarden (1969). He was also one of the people behind the satirical VARA TV-program Zo is het toevallig ook nog eens een keer (1963–1964). At another broadcasting organisation, VPRO, he became editor in chief. He was partly responsible for the revolutionary course that organisation took. He also provided VPRO's documentaries with commentary.

From 1968 on, he worked for De Volkskrant as a columnist. In the 1960s and 1970s, he was seen as the voice of the intellectual left, specialized in satirical pieces about politics, current affairs and whatever was fashionable with the left-wing readers of the newspaper. Between 1978 and 1983, he was adjunct editor in chief at the newspaper. He wrote the column until 2006, when a conflict forced him to leave the newspaper. He continued his column for nrc.next.

References

External links
 Author's page on website Uitgeverij De Harmonie
 List of works at the Digitale bibliotheek voor de Nederlandse letteren
 Volkskrant January 21, 2007: Machiavelliprijs for Jan Blokker

1927 births
2010 deaths
Dutch journalists
Dutch columnists
Dutch political writers
20th-century Dutch historians
Dutch screenwriters
Dutch male screenwriters
Writers from Amsterdam